Phiwokuhle Sbusisiwe Mnguni is a South African featherweight boxer. She participated in the 2022 Commonwealth Games and secured South Africa's first women's boxing medal at the Commonwealth Games.

References 

Living people
Boxers at the 2022 Commonwealth Games
Commonwealth Games competitors for South Africa
2001 births
Commonwealth Games bronze medallists for South Africa
Commonwealth Games medallists in boxing
Medallists at the 2022 Commonwealth Games